Thomas Hobson (c. 15441 January 1631) was an English carrier, best known as the origin of the expression Hobson's choice.

Eponym

The term "Hobson's choice" originated in the mid-seventeenth century, after Hobson's death. The poet John Milton made Hobson, and the phrase, well known, by satirising him several times in mock epitaphs.

Career

Joseph Addison and his co-editor Richard Steele commented on Hobson in The Spectator:

Hobson arranged the delivery of mail between London and Cambridge up and down the Old North Road, operating a lucrative livery stable outside the gates of St Catharine's College, Cambridge as an innkeeper. When his horses were not needed to deliver mail, he rented them to students and academic staff of the University of Cambridge.

The George Inn in Cambridge where Hobson's stable was situated was located on the current grounds of St Catharine's College and the stables were on the site of the current college chapel.

Hobson soon discovered that his fastest horses were the most popular, and thus overworked. So as not to exhaust them, he established a strict rotation system, allowing customers to rent only the next horse in line.

This policy, "this one or none" ("take it or leave it"), has come to be known as "Hobson's choice". It is not an absence of choice, rather choosing one thing or nothing.

In legal jargon, Hobson's Choice is known to barristers as the "cab-rank rule"; the gentleman's agreement that a barrister take a client who is first in line, whether the barrister likes it or not. This may come from Hobson's choice of renting out hackney horses strictly by rote (long before the creation of the London Hackney Carriages Act 1843).

Public works

Hobson is best remembered in the English vernacular as something of a miser, but he was actually a very public-spirited man. He funded the construction of Hobson's Conduit (or "Hobson's Brook"), a man-made watercourse built in 1614 to provide clean drinking water to the population of Cambridge. The conduit channelled water from Vicar's Brook, a lesser tributary of the River Cam fed by springs at Nine Wells five miles south of Cambridge.

Hobson is commemorated at Nine Wells on a nineteenth century obelisk and in Cambridge on a seventeenth century stone fountain at the conduit head. The fountain was moved there in 1856 from its original location in the Market Square after a fire in 1849, when it was replaced by a cast iron drinking fountain. Upstream the conduit is flanked by gardens adjoining Brookside and by the Cambridge University Botanic Garden. Downstream from the conduit head, the watercourse divides into four separate branches, mostly in underground culverts; the original drainage runnels on Trumpington Street, the oldest branch, are still visible on either side of the road.

Later life and legacy
Hobson bought Anglesey Priory in 1625 and converted it into a country house, which, under the name Anglesey Abbey, now belongs to the English National Trust.

Hobson had acquired lands around Chesterton, Cambridgeshire by the late 1590s, but by 1608 had assigned them to his son Charles. Hobson lived at Chesterton Hall in 1627, four years before his death in 1631.

In Cambridge city centre, two short streets named Hobson's Passage and Hobson Street conjoin very near to his old coaching inn, at the junction of Jesus Lane and King Street. The inn is now part of the "King Street Run" (a student pub crawl), and has had various changes of name but since 2013 has been called the Cambridge Brewhouse.

Notes

References

1544 births
1631 deaths
British postal officials
16th-century English people
People from Cambridge
People from Chesterton, Cambridge